Raymordella is a genus of beetles in the family Mordellidae, containing the following species:

Raymordella adusta Franciscolo, 1967
Raymordella ambigua Franciscolo, 1956
Raymordella transversalis Franciscolo, 1967

References

Mordellidae
Insect subgenera